Millie Brown (born 1986 in London, UK) is an English performance artist known for her work involving vomiting. She rose to prominence after a series of collaborations with musician Lady Gaga. She is also a founding member of the !WOWOW! Collective of London, England. She began her career at age 17 on a Berlin stage where she vomited onto a canvas after drinking glasses of dyed milk, a performance that lasted for two hours. In an interview with The Guardian, she states, “I wanted to use my body to create art. I wanted to come from within, to create something beautiful that was raw and uncontrollable.” She now works and resides in Los Angeles, California.

Works 
Millie Brown has performed variations of her vomit painting, as well as other forms of performance art.

2018
Performance and film premiere of ‘The impossibility of united formations colliding’ Presented by MAK Center for Art & Architecture featuring the collaboration within James Turrell and John Lautner's ’Above Horizons.’

2017
‘Human Condition’ performance curated by Johnny Wolf alongside artists Jenny Holzer, Marilyn Minter.

2016
‘As the cosmos unfolds’ performance and exhibition of new works at Cob Gallery London.
‘Wilting Point’ durational performance and exhibition of new works, at LA Art Show Presented by Ace Gallery, Beverly Hills.
Performance curated by Tara Subkoff at Urs Fischers private residence. 
Performance and exhibition of physical works curated by Stacy Engman at Chicago Expo.
‘Visual Artist of the year’ awarded to Millie Brown by BritWeek alongside talk & exhibition of works Presented by Ace Gallery, Beverly Hills.

2015
‘Celestial Bodies’ performance at MADE LA alongside film launch on Nowness.com
Rainbow Body Performance Presented by MOCA Miami & ArtCapsul, curated by Stacy Engman in conjunction with Ellen Von Unwerth's art series ‘Wilden’ featuring the artist, during Art Basel Miami Beach.
Rainbow Body Performance, 4 day durational piece at Gazelli Art House during Frieze Art Fair London.
Rainbow Body Performance, 4 day durational piece at Art & Fashion Forum Poland, curated by Grazyna kulczyk.

2014
Suspended by Optimism, Creative Royalty : A Celebration of Women in Art, a fundraiser for Brooklyn Museum Elizabeth A. Sackler Center for Feminist Art and School of Doodle, Curated by Nicole Ehrlich for Art Basel Miami Beach, Fl.
Jeffrey Deitch private birthday performance at his Los Angeles
residence. 
Swine, Live performance collaboration with Lady Gaga for her SXSW show, Austin, Tx.
Breaking the Body's Boundaries: Performance and Artist Talk, University of Toronto, Curated by Allison Leadley and Kelsy Vivash, Toronto, Canada.

2013
Born This Way Foundation Benefit, Curated by Nicole Ehrlich in collaboration with 5D- Society & Paddle 8, Art Basel Miami Beach, Fl.

2010
Rart Order: Performance and interactive life drawing, Bistroteque, Curated by Leanne Elliot, London, UK.

2008
Late at Tate, Tate Britain, Curated by Andrew Hunt, alongside works by Theo Adams, Matthew Stone and Boo Saville, London, UK.

2007
Fash-Off: Live Performance, SHOWstudio, Curated by Gareth Pugh and Nick Knight, London, UK.
Future Hindsight, The Union Gallery, Performance for Matthew Stone's exhibition opening, London, UK.
The Children of !WOWOW!, Transmediale Festival, Haus Der Kulturen Der Welt Transmediale, Berlin, Germany.
The Event, The Old Train Station, Curated by Andy Hunt, !WOWOW! Intervention in conjunction with The International Project Space, Bournville Centre for Visual Arts, Birmingham, UK.

2006
Switch On/Off, Chapman Fine Arts, Curated by Mark McGowen, London, UK. 2005, A Home for Lost Ideas, Public Gallery Berlin,
Germany. Optimism as Cultural Rebellion !WOWOW! Area 10, London, UK. Rising Tendencies Towards a United State of Mind !WOWOW! Kwik Fit Garage, Peckham, UK

SOLO EXHIBITIONS
2015, Rainbow Body, Curated by Nicole Ehrlich and Nathaly Charria, Los Angeles, Ca. 2013, Muted Chronology, Strand Gallery, Curated by Alexander Proud, London, UK. 2012, Celestial Bodies, Illoulian Contemporary, Curated by Candice Illoulian, Los Angeles, Ca. 2010, Series Black, Arthur And Albert Gallery, Curated by Zoniel & Walter Hugo, London, UK.

Rainbow Body 
Her solo exhibition, Rainbow Body, Brown conveyed the aesthetic of the Los Angeles Sky through vomiting pastel dyed almond milk onto canvases. Inspired by Tibetan Buddhist theology, she created the exhibition based on three elements of “ground, presence, and energy”.

Rainbow Body Performance 
At the Gazelli Art House in London,Brown displayed her body in a gallery window, suspended by rope from the ceiling for her piece Rainbow Body Performance. Crystal prisms dangled from her suspended body
creating rainbow reflections around the gallery space.

Suspended by Optimism 
In 2014, Brown suspended herself from giant helium balloons for four hours at the entrance of the Miami Beach Resort and Spa for her exhibition Suspended by Optimism. The exhibition opened for Nicole Ehrlich's second annual gala honoring women in art.

The Wilting Point 
Brown's exhibition, The Wilting Point took place at the Refinery Hotel of New York in a rotating gallery called “Hatbox”. She laid down in meditation surrounded by freshly cut flowers for seven days with no food, surviving off of only water, as the flowers wilted and decayed around her. The performance was on a 24-hour global live feed on the V Magazine website.

Collaboration with Lady Gaga 

Millie Brown is well known for her work with Lady Gaga. They collaborated on a video together in 2009, implementing Brown's dyed milk and vomit painting. Brown
and Lady Gaga collaborated on a performance of the singer's song, "Swine" at the SXSW conference in 2014. Brown drank green milk and then regurgitated it onto Lady Gaga's chest.

Criticism 
Since her work with Lady Gaga, Brown has been criticized for “glamorizing bulimia”. Much of the disapproval took place on Twitter, with Demi Lovato tweeting, “Bulimia isn’t cool. Young people who are struggling to figure out their identities are seriously influenced by the things they see their idols do.” Brown responded to the outrage over her work by saying, “I’m using my body to create something beautiful. I think it’s misunderstood by a lot of people. But it really doesn’t have anything to do with eating disorders. If I was male [no one would make] such a massive association."

References

Further reading 
 Vogue:http://www.vogue.com/article/millie-brown-performance-artist-best-eyebrows-beauty
 http://www.vogue.com/article/millie-brown-artist-frieze-art-fair-photo-diary
 http://milliebrownofficial.tumblr.com/post/78152239469/vogue-topshop-freixenet-celebrate-the-10-most
 TMZ: http://www.tmz.com/2014/03/14/lady-gaga-vomit-sxsw-video/
 http://www.tmz.com/2014/03/15/lady-gaga-puker-demi-lovato-didnt-glamorize-bulimia-sxsw-concert/
 US Magazine: http://www.usmagazine.com/entertainment/news/lady-gaga-gets-puked-on-by-vomit-painter-millie-brown-during-crazy-sxsw-concert--2014143
 http://www.usmagazine.com/entertainment/news/lady-gaga-defends-vomit-performance-at-sxsw-as-art-in-its-purest-form-2014213

1986 births
English performance artists
Living people
Entertainers from London